Football Club Kaganat Osh is a Kyrgyz football club based in Osh, Kyrgyzstan, founded in 2018.

History
Prior to the start of the 2020 season, Akademija Osh was split in to two clubs, FC Kaganat and FC Lider.

Domestic history

Players

Current squad

References

Football clubs in Kyrgyzstan
Association football clubs established in 2018